Monster TV is a children's television comedy drama about three children who run a TV show in their basement called "Monster TV", with monsters Herbert and Rocky as the stars. Little information was published about the show online.

Cast List 
 John Asquith as Rocky– Rocky is a monster made of stone, with long green grass for hair. A friend of Herbert, he is one of the stars of Billy, Karen and Terry's TV show "Monster TV".
 James O'Donnell as Herbert– the second star of "Monster TV", a troll-like monster.
 Sam Green as Billy, the producer and director of "Monster TV"; the show is filmed in the basement of his home.
 Natalie Dew as Karen, Billy's friend.
 Kevin Hemlall as Terry Billy's friend.
 Jenny Funnell as Mum
 Luke Sorba as Dad
 Anna Nicholas as Vera Venom – A Medusa-type monster; unlike Herbert and Rocky, Vera was not mean monster, obsessed with fame and fortune, and often trying to appear on Monster TV through trickery.

Crew
 Series creator: Jim Eldridge
 Producer: Jeremy Swan
 Writer: Jeremy Swan
 Executive producers: Claire Derry (Link Entertainment), Elaine Sperber (BBC)
 Directors: Carlene King, Gareth Davies
 Music director: Johnathan Cohen

References 

BBC children's television shows
British children's fantasy television series
British television shows featuring puppetry
1990s British children's television series
2000s British children's television series
English-language television shows